Gus' Pretzels is a pretzel bakery and snack counter in the Benton Park neighborhood of St. Louis, Missouri, United States. It was opened in 1920 by Frank Ramsperger. Gus' is a third generation family business owned by the Koebbe family. It is located at 1820 Arsenal Street near the Anheuser-Busch brewery.

Fresh pretzels are emblematic of the German American culture and community that have been prominent in St Louis. 

It won a Family Business Award from the St. Louis Business Journal in 2019. 

Gus's Pretzels has been a baker for street vendors, though only a few remain.

See also
Pretzels in the United States of America
Gooey butter cake, another product of St. Louis German bakers

References

External links
 Gus' Pretzels

Bakeries of the United States
Restaurants in St. Louis
Cuisine of St. Louis
Restaurants established in 1920
Pretzels
1920 establishments in Missouri